In advertising, a soft sell is an advertisement or campaign that uses a more subtle, casual, or friendly sales message. This approach is the opposite of a hard sell.

Theorists have examined the value of repetition for soft sell versus hard sell messages, in order to determine their relative efficacy. Frank Kardes and others have concluded that a soft sell, with an implied conclusion rather than an overt hard sell, can often be more persuasive. Soft sell is also less likely to be irritating to consumers.

See also
Hard sell
Advertising
Psychological manipulation

Notes

References
Herbert E. Krugman. An Application of Learning Theory to TV Copy Testing. The Public Opinion Quarterly, Vol. 26, No. 4 (Winter, 1962), pp. 626–634
Frank R. Kardes. Spontaneous Inference Processes in Advertising: The Effects of Conclusion Omission and Involvement on Persuasion. The Journal of Consumer Research, Vol. 15, No. 2 (Sep., 1988), pp. 225–233
David A. Aaker, Donald E. Bruzzone. Causes of Irritation in Advertising. Journal of Marketing, Vol. 49, No. 2 (Spring, 1985), pp. 47–57
Frank R. Kardes, Maria Cronley, Thomas Cline. Consumer Behavior, p. 212

Advertising techniques